Indya Adrianna Moore (born January 17, 1995) is an American actor and model. They are known for playing the role of Angel Evangelista in the FX television series Pose. Time named them one of the 100 most influential people in the world in 2019. Moore is transgender and non-binary, and uses they/them and she/her pronouns.

Early life 
Assigned male at birth, Indya Moore is a Bronx native of Haitian, Puerto Rican, and Dominican ancestry. At the age of 14, they left their parents' home due to their parents' transphobia, and entered into foster care. They moved around frequently during this time, eventually living in all five boroughs of New York City. After being frequently bullied, Moore dropped out of high school during their sophomore year. They began working as a model at the age of 15, and eventually earned their General Equivalency Diploma (GED).

Career

Early work 
Moore became a model at the age of 15, and began working shoots for Dior and Gucci, despite the fashion industry's initial treatment of them as a risky choice.

Although Moore was booking modeling gigs, they became increasingly disenchanted with the fashion industry and its emphasis on body image. Moore met ballroom dancer Jose Gutierez Xtravaganza while doing background for the television series The Get Down. He encouraged them to pursue acting and sent Moore to an audition for the independent film Saturday Church. Moore landed the role of Dijon, and the film was screened at the Tribeca Film Festival. The Hollywood Reporter called it "sweet and soulful". The film was later released on January 12, 2018, by Samuel Goldwyn Films.

In early 2017, Moore walked in New York Fashion Week and was photographed for Vogue España. That year, Moore appeared in Katy Perry's music video for the single "Swish Swish", and performed live with Perry on the May 20, 2017, episode of Saturday Night Live, where they were credited as a member of the House of Xtravaganza.

Pose television series 
In late 2017, Moore was cast in Pose, Ryan Murphy's FX television series about New York City ball culture in the late 1980s. Moore portrays Angel Evangelista, a transgender sex worker who joins the House of Evangelista after leaving the House of Abundance with her friend Blanca, portrayed by Michaela Jaé Rodriguez. While working at the piers, she meets Stan, a yuppie played by Evan Peters, and becomes his mistress.

The series premiered on June 3, 2018. The first season boasted the largest cast of transgender actors ever for a scripted network series with over 50 transgender characters. On July 12, 2018, it was announced that the series had been renewed for a second season, which premiered on June 11, 2019.

Present projects 
In 2018, Moore signed a contract with IMG Models and William Morris Endeavor (WME). Moore was WME's first signed contract with a trans actor. Moore also started the production company Beetlefruit Media, which provides a platform for stories about disenfranchised groups.

Moore has appeared in J.View's 2017 "Don't Pull Away" music video, and in Blood Orange's 2018 "Saint" video.

In May 2019, Moore became the first transgender person to be featured on the cover of the U.S. version of Elle magazine.

In December 2019, Moore debuted as the voice of Shep on the animated limited series Steven Universe Future. The character is also non-binary and partner of Sadie Miller.

Moore had been cast in the psychological thriller film Escape Room: Tournament of Champions, the sequel to the 2019 film Escape Room. The film was released on July 16, 2021.

Moore voices the character Brooklyn, one of Lunella's classmates, in Moon Girl and Devil Dinosaur.

Upcoming projects 
Moore will appear in the upcoming horror television series, Magic Hour, a gender-bending recreation of Mary Shelley's Frankenstein, directed by Che Grayson and filmed in Tokyo, on which they also serve as an executive producer. Moore is set to appear in the short film Spot.

In June 2020, in honor of the 50th anniversary of the first LGBTQ Pride parade, Queerty named them among the fifty heroes "leading the nation toward equality, acceptance, and dignity for all people".

Personal life 
Moore is transgender and non-binary and goes by they/them and she/her pronouns. Moore has spoken openly about their lifelong struggles with the bullying and transphobia that caused them to leave home at 14 and drop out of school in the 10th grade.

In an interview with Pose co-star Michaela Jaé Rodriguez, Moore discussed how, despite identifying as non-binary, being seen as a woman means they are still subjected to the same "surveillance and scrutiny" as women, and to a desire to use fashion to take back that power: 
MOORE: I feel like that about fashion. I feel like that about us having the autonomy to express ourselves. I'm non-binary but I don't really talk about it that much. I don't feel like people really are there yet for understanding it, which I don't mind, but I also acknowledge the way people see me as a woman. And because I'm seen as a woman, a cis woman or binary presenting, people are going to hold me up to those same standards that women are held up to.

RODRIGUEZ: Which you're saying you shouldn't be, right?

MOORE: Which I'm saying women should not be.

In December 2018, Moore came out as polyamorous.

Filmography

Film

Television

Music videos

See also 
 LGBT culture in New York City
 List of LGBT people from New York City

Notes

References

External links
 
 

1995 births
Living people
21st-century American actors
American people of Dominican Republic descent
American people of Haitian descent
American television actors
Entertainers from the Bronx
Hispanic and Latino American actors
IMG Models models
LGBT African Americans
LGBT people from New York (state)
American people of Puerto Rican descent
American non-binary actors
Non-binary models
Transgender non-binary people
Transgender rights activists
LGBT Hispanic and Latino American people
Transgender models
21st-century African-American people
Polyamorous people
Agender people